Alexander Petrovich Lifanov (born 15 April 1996) is a Russian modern pentathlete. He competed in the men's event at the 2020 Summer Olympics. He won the silver medal in the men's event and the gold medal in the men's relay event at the 2021 World Modern Pentathlon Championships held in Cairo, Egypt. He won the 2021 Cup of the President of the Russian Federation.

References

External links
 

1996 births
Living people
Russian male modern pentathletes
Modern pentathletes at the 2020 Summer Olympics
Olympic modern pentathletes of Russia
Modern pentathletes at the 2014 Summer Youth Olympics
Youth Olympic gold medalists for Russia
People from Megion
World Modern Pentathlon Championships medalists
Sportspeople from Khanty-Mansi Autonomous Okrug